Devanthakudu may refer to:
Devanthakudu (1960 film)
Devanthakudu (1984 film)